William Dunn (born 23 June 1949) is a Canadian bobsledder. He competed in the four man event at the 1976 Winter Olympics.

References

1949 births
Living people
Canadian male bobsledders
Olympic bobsledders of Canada
Bobsledders at the 1976 Winter Olympics
Sportspeople from Ottawa